Suhum, Sūḫu, or Suhi was an ancient geographic region around the middle course of the Euphrates River, south of Mari.

History
Its known history covers the period from the Middle Bronze Age (c. 2000-1700/1600 BCE) to the Iron Age (c. 1200-700 BCE).

Middle Bronze
During the Bronze Age, Suhum was divided into an Upper Suhum, with its capital in Hanat, and a Lower Suhum with its capital in Jabliji. Several ancient letters place the Sutean people as having lived in the region of Suhum.

Iron Age

Neo-Babylonian period
In 616 BCE, Suhum subordinated themselves to the king of Babylon, Nabopolassar (ruled 626-605 BCE). Three years later, in 613 BCE, Suhum rebelled against him, which led Nabopolassar to send an expedition against Suhum.

References
Citations

Bibliography
 , pp. 666-668

Historical regions
Populated places on the Euphrates River